Daniel Leck (born 16 February 1999), is an Australian professional footballer who plays as a winger for Olympic FC in the National Premier Leagues Queensland.

Club career

Brisbane Roar
Leck made his first appearance as a second-half substitute in the Roar's 2–1 loss to Melbourne Victory in Round 11 of the 2017–18 season.

Leck was part of the 2018-19 Y-League championship winning Brisbane Roar U21 team. He scored the 2nd goal as Roar beat Western Sydney Wanderers U21 3–1 in the 2019 Y-League Grand Final on 1 February 2019.

Pascoe Vale
In June 2019, Leck signed for Pascoe Vale.

Honours
Brisbane Roar
Y-League: 2018–19

References

External links

1999 births
Living people
Australian soccer players
Association football midfielders
Brisbane Roar FC players
A-League Men players
National Premier Leagues players